Religion in the Falkland Islands is predominantly Christianity, of which the primary denominations are Church of England, Roman Catholic, United Free Church, and Lutheran. In the 2006 census most islanders identified themselves as Christian (67.2 percent), followed by those who refused to answer or had no religious affiliation (31.5 percent). The remaining 1.3 percent (39 people) were adherents of other faiths.

Anglican
The Anglican Parish of the Falkland Islands is an extra-provincial church in the Anglican Communion. The principal Anglican place of worship in the Falkland Islands is Christ Church Cathedral in Stanley. The archbishop of Canterbury serves as ex officio bishop of the Falkland Islands.

Roman Catholic

There are over 230 Roman Catholics in the Falkland Islands, approximately 10% of the total population. There are no dioceses in the islands, instead they form an apostolic prefecture which was erected in January 1952. St Mary's Catholic Church in Ross Road in Stanley is the sole Catholic Church on the Falkland Islands. Outside of Stanley, Catholic masses are celebrated at RAF Mount Pleasant.

Presbyterian

Before the Disruption of 1843 the dominant religion was Church of Scotland. This was thereafter the Free Church of Scotland as most islanders sided with this more conservative view on religion. From 1900 this, as with the majority of Free Church of Scotland congregations, became the United Free Church of Scotland, on the island just called the United Free Church. From 1871 to 1883 their minister was Rev Anthony Yeoman (1821-1889).

The United Free Church in the Falkland Islands has five congregations with 120 active members. The Tabernacle, one
of the five congregations is in Stanley and it was established in 1899.  From 1934 to 1965, Rev Forrest McWhan (1913-1965), originally a Church of Scotland missionary, was the minister of The Tabernacle.

Baptist
Charles Spurgeon of the Metropolitan Tabernacle in London sent materials for the a church to be constructed.  The church is currently located in Stanley and is known as the Tabernacle Free Church.

Other groups
As of 31 December 2011, The Church of Jesus Christ of Latter-day Saints reported ten members in the Falkland Islands.

Smaller numbers are of Jehovah's Witnesses, Seventh-day Adventists and Greek Orthodox are also to be found, with the latter being due to Greek fishermen passing through.

A small number of followers of the Baháʼí Faith live on the islands, and have a policy of trying to settle remote locations.

Notes

External links
falklandislands.com - religion and weddings